Irthington is a civil parish in the Carlisle district of Cumbria, in North West England.  It contains 31 listed buildings that are recorded in the National Heritage List for England.  Of these, one is listed at Grade II*, the middle of the three grades, and the others are at Grade II, the lowest grade.  The parish contains the village of Irthington, and the smaller settlements of Laversdale, Newby East, Oldwall, Ruleholme, and Newtown, and is otherwise rural.  Most of the listed buildings are farmhouses and farm buildings, and the others include private houses, milestones, a bridge, a war memorial, and a church.


Key

Buildings

References

Citations

Sources

Lists of listed buildings in Cumbria